Ralph Jennings Twiggs Jr. (March 11, 1928 – September 17, 2003) was an American politician from Georgia. He served more than 30 years in the Georgia House of Representatives.

Early life and education
Twiggs was born in Hiawassee, Georgia, in 1928. As a teenager, Twiggs befriended future Governor and Senator Zell Miller.

In 1951, he graduated from the Southern College of Pharmacy. After serving in the medical division of the United States Air Force in 1952, Twiggs began a career as a pharmacist.

Political career
Twiggs was first elected to the Georgia House of Representatives in 1972. He would go on to win a total of sixteen terms in the chamber, amassing significant seniority. During his final term in office, Twiggs had risen to become chair of the Transportation Committee. He had also previously chaired the Public Safety Committee. A passionate advocate for public education, Twiggs championed Georgia's free kindergarten program.

Death
Twiggs died of pneumonia in Houston on September 17, 2003, where he was receiving chemotherapy treatment for cancer.

References

1928 births
2003 deaths
Democratic Party members of the Georgia House of Representatives